PGDE may stand for two similar postgraduate teaching qualifications:

 Postgraduate Diploma in Education or Graduate Diploma of Education, a one-year postgraduate course in places including Australia, New Zealand, Ireland, Hong Kong and Singapore for bachelor's degree holders leading to become a qualified teacher
 Professional Graduate Diploma in Education, a one-year postgraduate course in Scotland for bachelor's degree holders, qualifying an individual to teach in a Scottish state school.